Trichodrilus is a genus of Lumbriculidae.

The genus was described in 1862 by René-Édouard Claparède.

It has cosmopolitan distribution.

Species:
 Trichodrilus allobrogum (Claparède, 1862)
 Trichodrilus angelieri (Giani & Rodriguez, 1994)
 Trichodrilus aporophorus (Popčenko, 1976)
 Trichodrilus seirei (Timm, 1979)

References

Lumbriculidae